Alexandra Mardell (born 27 July 1993) is an English actress, known for portraying the role of Emma Brooker in the ITV soap opera Coronation Street. In 2019, for her portrayal of the role, she won the British Soap Award for Best Newcomer, and was nominated for Newcomer at the National Television Awards.

Early and personal life
Mardell was born in Leeds on 27 July 1993. She was born to parents Janet and Michael; her father Michael died in 2016 from cardiomyopathy. She attended Batley Grammar School between 2004 and 2009. Mardell studied acting at the Guildford School of Acting (GSA), graduating in 2018. In 2015, while attending GSA, Mardell met fellow actor Joe Parker, with whom she began a relationship in 2017. In April 2021, she announced her engagement to Parker.

Career
In 2017, Mardell made her professional acting debut in an episode of the ITV crime drama series Vera. Later that year, she starred in the short film Chocolate Pieces. In 2018, she was cast in the ITV soap opera Coronation Street as series regular Emma Brooker. For her portrayal of the role, she was longlisted for Best Newcomer at the 2018 Inside Soap Awards, nominated for Newcomer at the 24th National Television Awards, and was later awarded the British Soap Award for Best Newcomer at the 2019 British Soap Awards. On November 30th, 2022, it was announced she would dance with Kai Widdrington for the 2022 Strictly Come Dancing Christmas Special, which she later went on to win.

Filmography

Awards and nominations

References

External links
 

1993 births
21st-century English actresses
Actresses from Leeds
Alumni of the Guildford School of Acting
Black British actresses
English soap opera actresses
English television actresses
Living people